Girlfriend is an Indian Hindi film released on 11 June 2004. The film was written and directed by Karan Razdan and produced by Pammi Baweja. It focuses on Tanya's (Isha Koppikar) obsessive relationship with Sapna (Amrita Arora), especially after Sapna starts dating Rahul (Aashish Chaudhary).

Plot
Tanya and Sapna are friends. Tanya never liked men from the very beginning. Tanya and Sapna share a relationship which is more than just being friends and they had a physical relationship while they were intoxicated. Though Sapna never considered Tanya a lesbian, she always trusted her as a friend. Tanya has strong feelings for Sapna and is quite possessive about her and it is not revealed to Sapna. A boy named Rahul comes in Sapna's life and they fall in love with each other and decide to get married. Tanya becomes envious of the growing closeness of Sapna and Rahul, and her hatred towards Rahul and other men increases. One night, Rahul is injured when a mysterious masked person attacks him. Tanya, who is also a kick-boxing champion, beats a male opponent in a fight. Sapna distrusts Rahul when he tries to make her understand that Tanya loves her, Sapna says that when they were drunk they had sexual contact but in real life they are not lesbians, just close friends.

One day Sapna learns that Tanya is a lesbian and she loves Sapna, Sapna starts hating Tanya when she discovers the truth about Tanya. On the same day Tanya sneaks into Rahul's house and beats him, Tanya tells Rahul that she was the masked person who attacked him and that she loves Sapna. Sapna arrives in Rahul's house and finds Tanya covered in blood and Rahul lying on the ground unconscious, however Rahul regains consciousness and electrocutes Tanya. But Tanya regains consciousness and runs towards Rahul to throw him out of the building's window, but Rahul steps aside and Tanya falls from the window and dies. In the end Rahul and Sapna bring flowers to Tanya's grave.

Cast
Isha Koppikar as Tanya Singh 
Aashish Chaudhary as Rahul Chaudhary
Amrita Arora as Sapna Verma  
Sumeet Nijhawan as Sameer (special appearance)
Shantanu Chappana
Dolly Malhotra

Soundtrack
The music director of the film is Daboo Malik. The singers include Shreya Ghosal, Sonu Nigam, Daboo Malik, Soumya Raoh, Shaan, Kumar Sanu, Abhijeet, Sunidhi Chauhan and Vaishali Samant.

See also
Bollywood films of 2004

References

External links
 
 Girlfriend at Bollywood Hungama

Indian erotic romance films
2000s Hindi-language films
Indian LGBT-related films
Lesbian-related films
T-Series (company) films
Films directed by Karan Razdan